Yun Chi-chang(윤치창;尹致昌, 1899–1973) was a South Korean diplomat, politician and businessman. Nicknamed Namgye (남계;南桂), he was the brother of Yun Chi-wang and half-brother of Yun Chi-ho.

He was the Republic of Korea's Ambassador to the United Kingdom (1948–1951) and Ambassador extraordinary to the Middle East (1960–1961) and Ambassador to Turkey (1961–1962).

References

External links
 haepyung Yun clean, family web site 
 뉴욕한인 이야기/ 뉴욕 최초의 한인 치과의사 윤종선 한국일보 2011-06-30 

South Korean politicians
Ambassadors of South Korea to Turkey
Ambassadors of South Korea to the United Kingdom
20th-century South Korean businesspeople
University of Chicago alumni
1899 births
1973 deaths